François-Alexandre Galepides, known by the stage name Moustache, was a French actor and jazz drummer of Greek descent. He was born 14 February 1929 in Paris and died 25 March 1987 in Arpajon in a car accident.

Biography
In 1948 he joined Lorient, the orchestra of Claude Luter, as a drummer, playing in clubs of Saint-Germain-des-Prés. He also regularly accompanied Sidney Bechet in France.

From 1950, he led his own bands (Les sept complices and Les gros minets). With the group Moustache et ses Moustachus, from 1956, he recorded, as a drummer and singer, several rock'n'roll novelty songs (e.g. "Le Croque-Skull-Creux", on a text by Boris Vian).

In 1978, he formed the group Les petits Français (including Marcel Zanini, Michel Attenoux and François Guin), which recorded, among other things, jazz pieces by Georges Brassens.

In parallel, Moustache had a career as a restaurateur (the restaurant Moustache, Avenue Duquesne Paris), head of clubs (in the 1960s, The Bilboquet and in 1976, The Jazz Club at the Hotel Méridien Etoile), comic and actor.

He was a member of the Star Racing Team in motor racing, with other celebrities of the 1980s such actors Jean-Louis Trintignant and Guy Marchand.

Filmography 
1954 : Du rififi chez les hommes
1955 : Ce sacré Amédée
1956 : The Lebanese Mission as Hassan
1956 : Law of the Streets
1956 : Paris, Palace Hôtel as Le maître d'hôtel du réveillon
1957 : Love in the Afternoon as Butcher (uncredited) 
1957 : Three Days to Live as Davros
1957 : Le Grand Bluff as Moustache
1957 : Incognito 
1957 : Mademoiselle Strip-tease as Moustache
1957 : Comme un cheveu sur la soupe as Drummer in the orchestra
1958 : Neither Seen Nor Recognized as Ovide Parju, the gamekeeper
1959 : Ramuntcho as L'aubergiste
1959 : Pêcheur d'Islande 
1959 : Sergent X as Lopez
1959 : La Nuit des traqués
1960 : Jack of Spades as Café patron
1961 : Vive Henri IV... vive l'amour ! as La Ferrière
1961 : Fanny
1961 : Paris Blues as Drummer
1963 : L'Abominable Homme des douanes as Inspector
1963 : In the French Style as Restaurateur
1964 : Hardi Pardaillan!
1964 : Circus World as Barman
1965 : The Art of Love
1965 : Lady L as Client
1966 : How to Steal a Million as Guard
1967 : Two for the Road
1968 : Mayerling as Bratfish
1968 : A Flea in Her Ear as Fat Man in Room 11 
1968 :  as Gustav
1969 : Avalanche – sous réserve
1970 : Le Cri du cormoran le soir au-dessus des jonques
1975 : Zorro as Sergeant Garcia
1975 : Au-delà de la peur as Georgeaud
1976 : Attention les yeux !
1977 : Monsieur Papa as Gilles's father
1978 : Silver Bears as Señor Bendetti
1978 : Le Dernier Amant romantique 
1979 : Le Maître-nageur as Zopoulos
1982 : Deux heures moins le quart avant Jésus-Christ as Emir
1984 : Neuville ma belle

References
Moustache. Tambour battant : (propos recueillis par Guillaume Hanoteau). Julliard, 1975.
 Yvan Foucart: Dictionnaire des comédiens français disparus, Mormoiron : Éditions cinéma, 2008, 1185 p.

External links 
 

French male film actors
French jazz drummers
Male drummers
Musicians from Paris
1929 births
1987 deaths
Male actors from Paris
20th-century French male actors
Road incident deaths in France
20th-century French musicians
French people of Greek descent
20th-century drummers
20th-century French male musicians
French male jazz musicians